Mariela Cingo (born 14 Aug 1978) is an Albanian pianist currently living in the United Kingdom.

She started to learn music from the age of six, and gave her first concert at the age of seven. At the age of 17 she moved to the UK to continue her studies at the London College of Music. There she won many prizes, including the Piano Concerto Prize for her performance of Rachmaninoff's Second Piano Concerto. Her recent engagements have included performances of Rachmaninoff's Second Piano Concerto with the Sutton Symphony Orchestra and Schostakovich's Second Piano Concert with the Orchestra of the London College of Music.

References

1978 births
Living people
Albanian pianists
English classical pianists
English women pianists
Albanian emigrants to England
People from Korçë
21st-century English women musicians
21st-century classical pianists
21st-century women pianists